The Ariyaka script is an obsolete alphabet, invented by King Mongkut as an alternative to transcribing Pali, the liturgical language of Theravada Buddhism. The script, inspired by the Greek and Burmese-Mon scripts, did not come into popular use and eventually fell out of usage.

History 

During religious reforms in mid-nineteenth century Rattanakosin Kingdom, King Mongkut discouraged use of the Khom Thai script, which is derived from Khmer, in religious works for reason that its exclusivity gave wrong impression that Khmer script was holy and magical, ordering the monks to switch to the Thai script in recording Buddhist canon. In the 1840s, Mongkut invented the Ariyaka script to promote printing of Tripiṭaka, instead of traditionally inscribing on palm leaf manuscripts. The script was adapted from both the Greek and Burmese-Mon scripts, and was intended to supplant other existing scripts for transcribing Pali, including Khom Thai and Tai Tham.

References

External links 

Constructed scripts
Obsolete writing systems
Writing systems introduced in the 19th century
Writing systems of Asia
Pali
Buddhism in Thailand
Publishing in Thailand
Thai language
Thai inventions